Fontanetto Po is a comune (municipality) in the Province of Vercelli in the Italian region Piedmont, located about  northeast of Turin and about  southwest of Vercelli.

Fontanetto Po borders the following municipalities: Crescentino, Gabiano, Livorno Ferraris, Moncestino, Palazzolo Vercellese, and Trino.

Main sights
Oratory of St. Sebastian, built perhaps in the 11th century, and remade in the 15th century. The interior houses remains of mid-15th century frescoes.
Parish church of St. Martin, built in the 11th century and restored in the 16th–18th centuries
Church of the Holy Trinity, built from 1488
15th century St. John Watermill

People
Giovanni Battista Viotti (1755–1824), violinist and  composer was born in Fontanetto Po. He was one of the great composers and violinists of his time. He is also credited of having composed the music of the Marseillaise, the French National Hymn, eleven years before Claude Joseph Rouget de Lisle.

References

Cities and towns in Piedmont